HNLMS Alkmaar may refer to the following ships of the Royal Netherlands Navy that have been named after Alkmaar:

 , a unique screw sloop
 , the lead ship of her class of minehunters

Royal Netherlands Navy ship names